, also known as  for short, is a series of live action stage musicals directed by Yukio Ueshima based on the manga series The Prince of Tennis created by Takeshi Konomi and serialized by Shueisha in Weekly Shōnen Jump.

The first musical premièred in the Golden Week of 2003, and the unexpected popularity, especially among girls, and requests for merchandise of the show encouraged Marvelous Entertainment to follow through with the series. Each new show covers an arc of the manga storyline, though adaptations to the original story were made to fit the format. Female characters were removed, and irrelevant scenes or minor arcs were cut to move the plot forward.

At the start of the production, tickets did not sell out and the type of production was merely an experiment. Manga-based musicals were not frequently seen, if at all. However, the musicals soon became popular via word-of-mouth and social media enough to demand for double casting of characters to handle the number of performances and to allow for overseas performances in Korea and Taiwan. In addition multiple shows were live streamed into theatres all around the country to make up for the lack of enough seats in the actual venue. Even Europe got a taste of the production, when three of the actors (namely Ryousuke Katou, Shintarou Akiyama and Yuuichirou Hirata) hit Paris to attend the 10th edition of the Japan Expo in 2009

In May 2010, after 7 years, 22 musicals, 5 main casts and about 150 different actors had passed, the "first season" came to an end with the last performance of Dream Live 7th on the 23rd. Not too long after the end of the first season the start of a "second season" was commenced. The shows featured a completely new cast and a new script, but covered the same arcs as the first season. Following the end of the second season in 2014 a "third season" was made; similar to the second season, it featured a completely new cast and a new script, but covered the same arcs. The 3rd season commenced in February 2015 and ended in May 2020.

Synopsis

12-year-old tennis prodigy Ryoma Echizen returns to live with his father in Japan after winning the American Junior Tournament four consecutive times. He enrolls in Seishun Academy (known as "Seigaku" for short) and joins its famous tennis team, who strives to win the National Middle School Tennis Tournament. Though Ryoma immediately becomes a regular on the team, he begins to develop his own tennis style and discover what the sport means to him as he encounters new friendships and obstacles during his journey to reach the top.

Principal roles and cast members

Seigaku

Fudomine

St. Rudolph

Yamabuki

Hyotei

Rokkaku

Rikkai

Higa

Shitenhoji

Extra

Echizen Nanjirou:

Reception and legacy
Musical: The Prince of Tennis has sold over 2 million tickets during the first 10 years of its run and is credited with the growing interest in 2.5D musicals. The musical productions were also credited for providing a starting point for young talents and launched the careers of many of young Japanese actors. The success also led its initial director, Makoto Matsuda, to launch the Japan 2.5-Dimensional Musical Association in 2014.

Musical: The Prince of Tennis celebrated its 15th anniversary with a cultural festival taking place at Sunshine City in Tokyo from 23 and 24 November 2018.

Production history
The original run started in 2003 and ended in 2010 with a total of 22 different shows. During the first show, only half of the seats in the theater were filled; however, interest was spread quickly via word-of-mouth, when audience members would get up from their seats to call their friends during intermissions. Two weeks before the premiere of Remarkable 1st Match: Fudomine, Kotaro Yanagi, who was portraying Ryoma Echizen, was involved in a car accident, causing him to be pulled out of the musicals temporarily to rehabilitate. He rejoined the first Seigaku cast for their last show and finished up as the second cast's Echizen. While he was recovering, the role of Echizen was filled in temporarily by Kimeru, who was portraying the role of Shusuke Fuji, before Yuya Endo was cast as the new Echizen. Endo continued to share the role when Yanagi rejoined the production, and he graduated from the musicals during Dream Live 2nd.

After the graduation of the second Seigaku cast, Hiroki Aiba stayed on the production to provide guidance to the new cast members, and eventually graduated with the third cast. Tomo Yanagishita, who came in late as the third cast's Kaidoh, stayed on as well with the fourth cast briefly and graduated on his own during Dream Live 5th. Also, Kousuke Kujirai and Aiba returned to the production later as last-minute replacements: Kujirai returned for the third cast's debut showings of the Advancement Match, Rokkaku after Takahiro Tasaki withdrew from the show, and Aiba returned for the fifth cast's debut showings of The Imperial Presence Hyotei Gakuen feat. Higa as it seemed there was trouble casting an actor for Fuji at the time. The majority of the first cast members returned for Dream Live 7th to perform their roles once more alongside fifth cast in 2010 to celebrate the end of the first run, with the exception of Yoshitsugu Abe, who was unavailable to reprise the role of Kawamura. Eiki Kitamura, who had played the role solely in the More Than Limit: St. Rudolph Gakuen musical, filled in.

2nd Season began in 2011 and ran until 2014 with a total of 11 different shows. It featured an all new script and cast. The first Seishun Academy cast of that generation graduated at their own exclusive event in 2012, Seigaku Farewell Party, with the exception of Yuuki Ogoe, who would go on to play Ryoma Echizen for the entirety of 2nd Season. The next Seishun Academy cast, Ogoe included, graduated during Dream Live 2014, marking the end of 2nd Season.

3rd Season began in 2015. The eighth Seishun Academy cast graduated during Seigaku VS Hyotei in 2016. Followed by the ninth Seishun Academy cast graduated during Seigaku VS Higa in 2018. Lastly, the tenth Seishun Academy cast are set to graduate during Dream Live 2020, marking the end of 3rd Season.

Productions

Aside from the musicals, which tell the plot of the original manga, Musical: The Prince of Tennis also tours with live concerts featuring music from the previous performances, known as "Dream Lives." Live concerts featuring music from specific teams are known as "Team Lives". Some of the shows are also classified as re-runs of a previous production, or also include a "graduation show", a special ceremony held to celebrate cast members who are leaving the production.

1st Season (2003-2010)

2nd Season (2011-2014)

3rd Season (2015-2020)

4th Season (2021-)

Concerts

Events

DVD releases

1st season

Supporter DVDs

Extra

2nd season

Team Collection

Extra

3rd season

Variety Smash!

ROAD

Discography

Each musical, excluding the winter performance of "The Imperial Match Hyoutei" and the summer performance of "Musical The Prince of Tennis" had a CD released, featuring all songs sung during the musical. Besides that 4 singles and 13 "Best of Actor Series" have been released. The singles feature multiple versions of the same song, already performed in the musicals. The "Best of Actor Series" CDs feature multiple song sung by one or two actors of the production. Some of the songs on these CDs are new, but some of them have already been performed during the musicals (by the same or other actors). For both the Musical CDs and the "Best of Actor Series" CDs box sets have been released.

Due to double casts, multiple versions of "The Imperial Presence Hyoutei" CD, "The Treasure Match Shitenhouji" CD and the "Complete Box 3" have been released.

CDs of "The Imperial Match Hyoutei in Winter" and "The Best of Actor Series 013" are only available through buying the box sets.

First season

Musical OST

Singles

Best of Actor Series

Complete Box Sets

Second season

Musical OST

Single CD

Third season

Musical OST

References

External links
 Official Prince of Tennis musicals website
 Official Nelke Entertainment website
 Official website

Japanese musicals
Musicals based on anime and manga
2.5D musicals